"She's Too Good to Be True" may refer to:
"She's Too Good to Be True" (Charley Pride song)
"She's Too Good to Be True" (Exile song)